Dominica competed in the Olympic Games for the first time at the 1996 Summer Olympics in Atlanta, United States.

Athletics 

Key
Q = Qualified for the next round
q = Qualified for the next round as a fastest loser or, in field events, by position without achieving the qualifying target
NM = No Mark recorded
NR = National record
N/A = Round not applicable for the event
Bye = Athlete not required to compete in round

Men

Women

Swimming 

Key
Q = Qualified for the next round
q = Qualified for the next round as a fastest loser or, in field events, by position without achieving the qualifying target
NR = National record
N/A = Round not applicable for the event
Bye = Swimmer not required to compete in round

Men

References
Official Olympic Reports
Dominican Olympic team homepage

Nations at the 1996 Summer Olympics
1996
1996 in Dominica sport